The Australian cricket team toured Britain from 22 June to 3 July 2010 where they played the Ireland and England cricket teams. The tour comprised one One Day International against Ireland and five against England.

The match against Ireland was played at Clontarf Cricket Club Ground, Dublin. Ireland, an associate member of the ICC pushing for Test status, gave the top-ranked ODI team in the world a scare. Limiting the Australians to 231/9 from their 50 overs, the Irish were eventually all out for 192 from 42 overs, giving Australia a 39-run victory.

The tour was a lead-in to the Australian series against Pakistan in England, which included two Tests. Pakistan did not host internationals in their own country at the time due to ongoing security problems.

Ireland

Only ODI

England

ODI series

1st ODI

2nd ODI

3rd ODI

4th ODI

5th ODI

Tour match

References

2010 in English cricket
2010 in Irish cricket
2010
2010
International cricket competitions in 2010
2010 in Australian cricket